The Federal Reserve Bank of San Francisco (informally referred to as the San Francisco Fed) is the federal bank for the twelfth district in the United States. The twelfth district is made up of nine western states—Alaska, Arizona, California, Hawaii, Idaho, Nevada, Oregon, Utah, and Washington—plus the Northern Mariana Islands, American Samoa, and Guam. The San Francisco Fed has branch offices in Los Angeles, Portland, Salt Lake City, and Seattle. It also has a cash processing center in Phoenix.

The twelfth district is the nation's largest by area and population, covering , or 36% of the nation's area, and 60 million people. The Federal Reserve Bank of San Francisco is the second-largest by assets held, after New York. In 2004 the San Francisco Fed processed 20.8 billion currency notes and 1.5 billion commercial checks.

The Federal Reserve Bank in San Francisco has one of the largest collections of US paper money in the United States, which is displayed in the American Currency Exhibit.

Mary C. Daly serves as the President and CEO as of October 1, 2018.  Notable former Presidents include John C. Williams (2011-2018), who now holds the same role at the Federal Reserve Bank of New York and is Vice Chairman of the Federal Open Market Committee, as well as Janet Yellen (2004-2010), who held the role of Chair of the Board of Governors from 2014-2018.

History
The San Francisco Federal Reserve Bank opened for business in rented quarters at the rear of the Merchants National Bank on November 16, 1914, in order to make the reserve provisions of the Federal Reserve Act. In 1924, the San Francisco staff moved out of temporary locations and into the Bank's newly built headquarters at 400 Sansome Street, a location that it would occupy for the next 60 years. In 1983, the bank relocated to 101 Market St.

Buildings

The old headquarters building of the bank, designed by George W. Kelham, has an Ionic colonnade that is pure Beaux-Arts, while the upper building is in the new Moderne fashion of 1924. The lobby with murals by Jules Guerin who created the palette for the 1915 Panama-Pacific International Exhibition. In 1983 the bank relocated to larger and more modern facilities on 101 Market Street as the 400 Sansome Street location was sold to private developers who rented out the space. Prominent law firm Orrick Herrington & Sutcliffe was headquartered in the building until 2002 when the firm moved out of the space. The building continues to be owned by private developers and current tenants include the Bar Association of San Francisco.  It is listed on the National Register of Historic Places (NRHP).

There is also a Federal Reserve Bank of San Francisco building in Los Angeles.  The 1929 built building is also NRHP-listed.

From 1951 to 2008, the Seattle branch was headquartered at the Federal Reserve Bank Building in Downtown Seattle, which had been built in 1951 for the branch and is listed on the NRHP.

Board of Directors
The following people serve on the board of directors :

Class A

Class B

Class C

Governors and presidents
The position was installed under the title of “Governor” until the Banking Act of 1935 abolished the dual role of governor and agent and created a single leadership role – president.

Branches
 Federal Reserve Bank of San Francisco, Los Angeles Branch
 Federal Reserve Bank of San Francisco Portland Branch
 Federal Reserve Bank of San Francisco Salt Lake City Branch
 Federal Reserve Bank of San Francisco Seattle Branch

See also

 Federal Reserve Act
 Federal Reserve System
 Federal Reserve Bank
 Federal Reserve Districts
 Federal Reserve Branches
 Federal Reserve Bank of San Francisco Building (San Francisco, California)
 Structure of the Federal Reserve System

Notes

References

External links
Official FRBSF Site
FRBSF Currency Exhibit
FRBSF Tour Info
Historical resources by and about the Federal Reserve Bank of San Francisco including annual reports back to 1915
Public Statements of Past Presidents of the Federal Reserve Bank of San Francisco on FRASER
Speeches of Presidents of the Federal Reserve Bank of San Francisco
The old main office building is at coordinates

San Francisco
Government buildings in San Francisco
Streamline Moderne architecture in California
Bank buildings on the National Register of Historic Places in California
Economy of the Western United States
National Register of Historic Places in San Francisco